Imani Winds is an American wind quintet based in New York City, United States. The group was founded by flutist Valerie Coleman in 1997 and is known for its adventurous and diverse programming, which includes both established and newly composed works. The word Imani means "faith" in Swahili. They are also active commissioners of new music with the intent of introducing more diverse composers to the wind quintet repertoire.

Overview
The name "Imani Winds" was chosen by Coleman before she formed the quintet. She viewed it as a vision of what the quintet could mean to African-American and other underrepresented communities.  Coleman wanted to form a chamber group to highlight the work of underrepresented composers and performers. Therefore, the group's initial members were all of African American and Latino ancestry. The group first included Valerie Coleman on flute, Toyin Spellman-Diaz on oboe, Monica Ellis on bassoon, Mariam Adam on clarinet, and Jeff Scott on french horn. In 2016 Mark Dover replaced Mariam Adam, in 2018 Brandon Patrick George replaced Valerie Coleman, and in 2021, Kevin Newton replaced Jeff Scott.  

The group has released four CDs. Their first CD on a major label, The Classical Underground (Koch Entertainment), was released in January 2005 and was nominated for a Grammy award in 2006.

In 2001 they won the Richard S. Weinert Award for Innovation in Classical Music from the Concert Artists Guild. In 2002, they won the CMA/ASCAP Award for Adventurous Programming and the CMA/WQXR Recording Award for their first album Umoja. In 2007, they won the ASCAP Concert Music Award.

Imani Winds have toured throughout the United States, Canada, and Europe, and participated in Chamber Music Society Two, a professional residency program of The Chamber Music Society of Lincoln Center. In addition, Imani has toured internationally and recorded with saxophonist Steve Coleman, performed with pop recording artists Morley, and opened for Cassandra Wilson and Wynton Marsalis. They have performed with several notable jazz musicians such as Wayne Shorter, Steve Coleman, Paquito D'Rivera, and Steffon Harris. They have appeared on radio programs including Saint Paul Sunday, Performance Today, Performance Today, News & Notes, The Bob Edwards Show, and The World.

Legacy Commissioning Project 
Imani Winds began the Legacy Commissioning Project in 2008 with the intention of commissioning and premiering ten new works for wind quintet by composers of color and diverse backgrounds over a five-year period. The group has continued to commission and premiered more works after the initial five-year time frame, and the group has continued their original intent to introduce more diverse composers to the standard wind quintet repertoire.

Commissions

Discography 

With Steve Coleman

 1999 – The Ascension to Light

With Brubeck Brothers Quartet

 2008 – Classified

With Chick Corea

 2012 - The Continents: Concerto for Jazz Quintet & Chamber Orchestra

With Wayne Shorter

 2013 – Without a Net

With Mohammed Fairouz

 2013 – Native Informant

With Edward Simon

 2018 – Sorrows & Triumphs

References

External links
Imani Winds official site
Imani Winds page at Jay K. Hoffman & Associates, Inc. site

Listening
Imani Winds on All Things Considered radio program, June 8, 2005
Imani Winds on Performance Today radio program, February 22, 2006
Imani Winds on News & Notes radio program, May 23, 2006
Imani Winds on All Things Considered radio program, June 11, 2007

Video
Imani Winds video

Musical groups established in 1997
Chamber music groups
African-American musical groups
Musical groups from New York City
Wind quintets